Korytovo is a rural locality (a village) in Kiprevskoye Rural Settlement, Kirzhachsky District, Vladimir Oblast, Russia. The population was 53 as of 2010. There are 22 streets.

Geography 
Korytovo is located 4 km east of Kirzhach (the district's administrative centre) by road. Kirzhach is the nearest rural locality.

References 

Rural localities in Kirzhachsky District